The 2021–22 Colgate Raiders men's basketball team represented Colgate University in the 2021–22 NCAA Division I men's basketball season. The Raiders, led by 11th-year head coach Matt Langel, played their home games at Cotterell Court in Hamilton, New York as members of the Patriot League. They finished the season 23–12, 16–2 and Patriot League play to finish as regular season champions for the second consecutive year. As the No. 1 seed, they defeated Bucknell, Lehigh, and Navy to win the Patriot League tournament. They received the conference’s automatic bid to the NCAA tournament for the second consecutive year. As the No. 14 seed in the Midwest Region, they lost in the first round of the NCAA Tournament to Wisconsin.

Previous season
The Raiders finished the 2020–21 season 14–2, 11–1 in Patriot League play to finish atop the North Division. In the Patriot League tournament, they defeated Boston University in the quarterfinals, Bucknell in the semifinals, advancing to the championship game for the fourth consecutive year. There, they defeated Loyola (MD), earning the Patriot League's automatic berth into the NCAA tournament. They drew the #14 seed in the South Region, where they would lose to #3 seed Arkansas in the first round.

Roster

Schedule and results

|-
!colspan=12 style=| Non-conference regular season

|-
!colspan=12 style=| Patriot League regular season

|-
!colspan=9 style=| Patriot League tournament

|-
!colspan=9 style=| NCAA tournament

Sources

References

Colgate Raiders men's basketball seasons
Colgate Raiders
Colgate Raiders men's basketball
Colgate Raiders men's basketball
Colgate